Nehantic State Forest is a publicly owned forest and recreation area occupying two parcels, one in the town of Lyme and one in the towns of East Lyme and Salem, in the state of Connecticut. The forest, which totals , is the site of regular prescribed burns and timber-harvesting operations. Purchase of the land began in 1926, when it became the first state forest located in New London County. It is managed by the Connecticut Department of Energy and Environmental Protection.

Activities and amenities
The forest offers opportunities for hiking, hunting, picnicking, swimming, and boating. The Lyme portion of the forest provides access to  Uncas Pond and  Norwich Pond. Boat launches are located on each pond. The ponds and their connecting stream, Falls Brook, sit at the western edge of Becket Hill State Park Reserve. No roads or trails pass from the state forest into the undeveloped and otherwise inaccessible  state park reserve though dirt park roads and the Blue-Blazed Nayantaquit Trail hiking trail system make much of the Lyme section (Western Block) of Nehantic State Forest easily accessible to the public.

See also
 Blue-Blazed Trails
 Lyme
 Nayantaquit Trail

References

External links

Nehantic State Forest Connecticut Department of Energy and Environmental Protection
Nehantic State Forest Map: Lyme Connecticut Department of Energy and Environmental Protection
Nehantic State Forest Map: East Lyme and Salem Connecticut Department of Energy and Environmental Protection

Connecticut state forests
Parks in New London County, Connecticut
Lyme, Connecticut
East Lyme, Connecticut
Salem, Connecticut
Protected areas established in 1926
1926 establishments in Connecticut